José Marcelo Gomes (born 24 November 1981 in Rio de Janeiro, Brazil) is a Brazilian naturalized Bolivian footballer currently playing for Independiente Petrolero in the Liga de Futbol Profesional Boliviano.

Club title

References

External links
 
 
 
 
 

1981 births
Living people
Footballers from Rio de Janeiro (city)
Naturalized citizens of Bolivia
Bolivian people of Brazilian descent
Association football midfielders
Brazilian footballers
Brazilian expatriate footballers
Bolivian footballers
Universitario de Sucre footballers
Club Aurora players
Club Bolívar players
Club San José players
C.D. Jorge Wilstermann players
Club Independiente Petrolero players